Ohio University Press (OUP), founded in 1947, is the oldest and largest scholarly press in the state of Ohio.  It is a department of Ohio University that publishes under its own name and the imprint Swallow Press.

History
The press publishes approximately 50 books annually and has a back catalog of over 1,500 titles. Ohio University Press entered into a licensing agreement with Alan Swallow's Swallow Press in 1979, eventually acquiring the imprint and its back catalog of 276 titles in 2008. The Hollis Summers Poetry Prize, named for the former Ohio University faculty member and poet, is awarded annually by Ohio University Press. Notable Ohio University Press titles include Robert Gipe's trilogy Trampoline, Weedeater, and Pop.

Imprints
 Swallow Press

See also

 List of English-language book publishing companies
 List of university presses

References

External links

Press
University presses of the United States
Book publishing companies based in Ohio
Publishing companies established in 1947
1947 establishments in Ohio
Mass media in Athens, Ohio